Salmon Creek is an  stream in western Sonoma County, California that springs from coastal hills west of the town of Occidental and empties into the Pacific Ocean north of Bodega Head.

Course
It parallels Bittner Road eastward, passing just south of Occidental, where it turns right and follows Bohemian Highway to the town of Freestone. From there, it curves south and then west, passing Watson School historic park as it parallels Bodega Highway to a confluence with Nolan Creek just east of the town of Bodega. It flows through Bodega, then follows Salmon Creek Road westward into a narrow canyon, where it is joined by Tannery Creek, Fay Creek, Coleman Valley Creek, and Finley Creek. Salmon Creek emerges from the canyon between Irish Hill and Coleman Hill and crosses State Route 1 at milepost 12.49, entering Sonoma Coast State Beach south of the ranger station. It parallels Bean Avenue to Salmon Creek Beach, which it bisects as it enters the Pacific Ocean.

History
When European explorers first reached Salmon Creek, they found it inhabited by Coast Miwok people. Six Coast Miwok villages near the creek have been authenticated: Pulya-lakum, near the mouth of the creek, Kennekono and Suwutenne near the present-day town of Bodega, and three near the present day town of Freestone: Oye-yomi, Pakahuwe, and Patawa-yomi.

In 1843-44, most of the Salmon Creek watershed was included in the  Rancho Bodega land grant awarded to Captain Stephen Smith.

In 1873, the North Pacific Coast Railroad built a narrow-gauge line along the stretch of Salmon Creek between Freestone and Occidental as part of the route from Sausalito to Cazadero.

Ecology

As of 2000, Salmon Creek and its five named tributaries all supported steelhead trout (Oncorhyncus mykiss). Salmon Creek also harbored California freshwater shrimp (Syncaris pacifica), and coho salmon (Oncorhyncus kisutch) were known to inhabit both Salmon Creek and Tannery Creek. By 2006, however, the salmon run had ceased. On July 2, 2010 the Salmon Creek Water Conservation Plan was released with important recommendations for restoring dry season instream flows, which have been exacerbated primarily by man-made water diversions. The Plan included such innovative solutions such as rooftop water harvesting and re-introduction of Golden Beaver. The historic presence of beaver was evident in the first Russian-American Company voyage by Ivan Kuskov who sailed into Bodega Bay in 1809 on the Kodiak and returned to Novo Arkhangelsk, Alaska (Sitka), with beaver skins and over 2,000 sea otter pelts. French naval captain Cyrille Laplace visited the Russian farms with the Aleksandr Rotchev, the last manager of Fort Ross, in 1839. After spending time at the Chernykh farm (near Graton probably on Purrington Creek) they rode to the Kirill Timofeevich Khlebnikov farm (near Bodega Corners) on Salmon Creek and wrote, "we had stopped a moment by a little river on the banks of which my traveling companion pointed out to me the former habitations of beaver, probably destroyed by the Indians in order to catch the rich prize that lay within." In 2009 and 2010 the California Department of Fish and Game have re-introduced coho salmon into Salmon Creek.

It is also the only extant location of the nearly extinct Baker's larkspur.

Bridges

At least seven bridges span Salmon Creek. Salmon Creek Road spans the creek on a  bridge dating from 1958, Bohemian Highway crosses on a  bridge from 1971, and Scouts Camp Road crosses on a  structure from 1960.

Further reading 
 DFG California Department of Fish and Game 1964. Salmon Creek Stream Survey, April 29, 1964 by Weldon Jones
 DFG California Department of Fish and Game 2004. Salmon Creek Stream Survey, September 2004
 USGS BODEGA HEAD Quad, California, Topographic map – 1972
 USGS VALLEY FORD Quad, California, Topographic map – 2009
 USGS CAMP MEEKER Quad, California, Topographic map – 2009

See also
 List of watercourses in the San Francisco Bay Area
 Salmon Creek Middle School

References

External links
 Salmon Creek Watershed Council
 Occidental Arts and Ecology WATER Institute

Rivers of Sonoma County, California
Rivers of Northern California